Bakwé is a Kru language of Ivory Coast.

References

Kru languages
Languages of Ivory Coast